The fifth competition weekend of the 2019–20 ISU Speed Skating World Cup was held at the Olympic Oval in Calgary, Canada, from Saturday, 7 February, until Sunday, 8 February 2020.

Medal summary

Men's events

Women's events

References

5
ISU World Cup, 2019-20, 5
2020 in Canadian sports
ISU